The Mexican Consortium of Universities (Spanish: Consorcio de Universidades Mexicanas, CUMEX) is a selective group of Mexican public higher education institutions, recognized by their higher quality standards.

Founded in May 2005, CUMEX has established a rigorous selection system. Members must be affiliated with the "umbrella" national association of universities (ANUIES by its acronym in Spanish). However, not all ANUIES members are able to comply with the eligibility criteria established at CUMEX.

Membership at CUMEX constitutes a reference about Mexican higher education institutions holding higher quality standards than their peers.

Educational quality eligibility criteria 
A CUMEX member institution must comply with the following criteria:

 Being a public university member of the National Association of Universities and Higher Education Institutions ANUIES.
 Having at least 85% of students enrolled in academic programs which are accredited according with the mechanisms established at the national system of evaluation and accreditation being accredited de la matrícula total en programas evaluables de técnico superior, profesional asociado y licenciatura reconocidos por su buena calidad por el sistema nacional de evaluación y acreditación de la educación superior de México.
 Having at least 50% of their full-time professors holding a graduate appropriate credential.
 Having at least one graduate program being included in the Mexican Roster of Quality Graduate Programs (Padrón Nacional de Posgrados, PNP).
 Holding an ISO certification in the following management processes: Registrar, Administration and Finances, Human Resources, and Library.
 Having established formal accountability and freedom of information policies and practices.
 Being included in the National Roster of Scientific and Technological Institutions and Corporations (Registro Nacional de Instituciones y Empresas Científicas y Tecnológicas: RENIECyT).
 Having implemented a series of academic and administrative policies.

Membership 

The following is the list of current member institutions at CUMEX. There are 28 as of 2020.

 BUAP: Meritorious Autonomous University of Pueblo
 UAA: Autonomous University of Aguascalientes
 UABC: Autonomous University of Baja California
UABCS: Autonomous University of Baja California Sur
 UACJ: Universidad Autónoma de Ciudad Juárez
UADY: Universidad Autónoma de Yucatán
 UAdeC: Autonomous University of Coahuila
UAEH: Universidad Autónoma del Estado de Hidalgo
UAEM: Autonomous University of Mexico State
UAGRO: Autonomous University of Guerrero
 UAQ: Autonomous University of Queretaro
 UASLP: Universidad Autónoma de San Luis Potosí
 UAS: Autonomous University of Sinaloa
UAT: Autonomous University of Tamaulipas
UATx: Autonomous University of Tlaxcala 
UAZ: Autonomous University of Zacatecas
UCOL: University of Colima
UdeG: University of Guadalajara
UG: Universidad de Guanajuato
UJAT: Universidad Juárez Autónoma de Tabasco
UJED: Universidad Juárez del Estado de Durango
UNACAR: Autonomous University of Carmen
UNICACH: University of Sciences and Arts of Chiapas
UMich: Universidad Michoacana de San Nicolás de Hidalgo
 UO: Universidad de Occidente
 UQROO: University of Quintana Roo
 UNISON: Universidad de Sonora
UV: Universidad Veracruzana

Presidents 
The General Assembly elects a President among the rectors of the member institutions.

List of Presidents:

 2005-2008: Mario Garcia-Valdez, UASLP
 2008-2010: Luis Gil Borja, UAEH
2010-2012: Mario Alberto Ochoa Rivera, UAdeC
2014-2016: Humberto Augusto Veras Godoy, UAEH
2016-: Javier Saldaña Almazán, UAGRO

References

External links 
 

2005 establishments in Mexico
Universities and colleges in Mexico
College and university associations and consortia in North America